Tómbola (in Latin America released as Los enredos de Marisol) is a 1962 Spanish musical film. It was the third movie to star child singer and actress Marisol.

Music 
 "Preludio"
 "Chiquitina"
 "Los reyes godos"
 "La Marselleise"
 "Una nueva melodía"
 "Tanguillos"
 "Tómbola"
 "Lobo, lobito"
 "Con los ojos abiertos"
 "Fandangos (Nadie lo sabe cantar)"
 "Final Tómbola"

External links 
 

Spanish musical films
1960s Spanish-language films
1962 musical films
1962 films
Films scored by Augusto Algueró
1960s Spanish films